Gillet is a Belgian automobile manufacturer.

Gillet may also refer to:

Games 
 Gillet (card game), an historical French card game.

People 

Alexandre Gillet (born 1983), French actor
André Gillet (1916-1993), Canadian politician
Andy Gillet (born 1981), French model and actor
Anthony Gillet (born 1976), French race walker
Antoine Gillet (born 1988), Belgian sprinter
Charles W. Gillet (1840-1908), American politician
Claude Casimir Gillet (1806-1896), French biologist and mycologist
Felix Gillet (1835-1908), French-American horticulturalist
Fernand Gillet (1882-1980), French-American oboist, nephew of Georges
Francis Warrington Gillet (1895-1969), American pilot
François Gillet (born 1949), French photographer
Georges Gillet (1854-1920), French oboist and composer, uncle of Fernand
Gillet de La Tessonerie (1620-1660), French playwright
Gillet de Laumont (1747-1834), French mineralogist
Guillaume Gillet (born 1984), Belgian footballer
Henri Gillet (born 1953), French-American mathematician
Jean-François Gillet (born 1979), Belgian footballer
Kenny Gillet (born 1976), French footballer
Lev Gillet (1893-1980), French archimandrite
Louis Gillet (1876-1943), French art and literary historian
Maurice Gillet (1763-1833), French naval officer
Nicolas Gillet (born 1976), French footballer
Numa François Gillet (1868-?), French painter
Pierre-Antoine Gillet (born 1991), Belgian basketball player
Ransom H. Gillet (1800-1876), American politician
Stéphane Gillet (born 1977), Luxembourger footballer
Thierry Gillet (born 1969), French jockey
Tony Gillet (born 1945), Belgian racing driver

Companies 
Gillet Herstal, Belgian motorcycle manufacturer

See also 
Gillett (disambiguation)
Gillette (disambiguation)
Gilet (disambiguation)